János Telegdy (1575–1647) was a Roman Catholic prelate who served as Archbishop of Kalocsa (1623–1647), Bishop of Nyitra (1619–1623), Bishop of Várad (1613–1619), and Bishop of Bosnia (1611–1613).

Biography
János Telegdy was born in Érsekújvár, Kingdom of Hungary (today Nové Zámky, Slovakia) in 1575 and ordained a priest in the Diocese of Esztergom on 10 February 1594. On 27 January 1610, he was appointed during the papacy of Pope Paul V as Bishop of Bosnia. On 25 September 1611, he was consecrated bishop by Roberto Francesco Romolo Bellarmino, Cardinal-Priest of San Matteo in Merulana, with Antonio d'Aquino, Bishop of Sarno, and Giulio Sansedoni, Bishop Emeritus of Grosseto, serving as co-consecrators. In 1613, he was appointed during the papacy of Pope Paul V as Bishop of Várad. On March 1619, he was appointed during the papacy of Pope Paul V as Bishop of Nyitra. In 1623, he was appointed during the papacy of Pope Gregory XV as Archbishop of Kalocsa. In 1624, he was once again appointed during the papacy of Pope Gregory XV as Bishop of Nitra. He served as Archbishop of Kalocsa until his death in 1647.

Episcopal succession
While bishop, Telegdy was the principal co-consecrator of:
János Pyber de Gyerkény, Bishop of Pécs (1614);
Péter Pázmány, Archbishop of Esztergom (1617);
István Sennyey, Bishop of Vác (1627);
György Drašković, Bishop of Pécs (1630); and
Imre Lósy, Bishop of Várad (1631).

References

17th-century Roman Catholic archbishops in Hungary
Bishops appointed by Pope Paul V
Bishops appointed by Pope Gregory XV
1575 births
1647 deaths
Archbishops of Kalocsa
Bishops of Bosnia
People from Nové Zámky
Bishops of Nitra